Beloe may refer to:

People
 Gerald Beloe (1877–1944), English cricket player
 William Beloe (1756–1817), English writer
 William Beloe (Royal Navy officer) (1909–1966), British navy officer

Other
 Beloe Report
 Krasnoe & Beloe